Eleanor Catherine Sperrey (7 January 1862 – 23 April 1893), also known as Kate Sperrey, was a noted portraitist from New Zealand who flourished at the end of the nineteenth century. She painted portraits of many of the most noted statesmen of New Zealand and has works in the permanent collections of the Museum of New Zealand Te Papa Tongarewa, the Alexander Turnbull Library, Auckland Art Gallery, and the Whangarei Art Museum.

Early life
Eleanor Catherine Sperrey was born on 7 January 1862 in Geelong, Victoria, Australia to Eleanor (née Maunder) and John Sperrey. The following year, her family moved to Dunedin, New Zealand, where her father, who had been a timber merchant, was engaged in the sub-treasurer's office as a clerk. In 1865, her mother died and Kate was raised by her father. She began studies at Otago Girls' High School in 1873, and studied art with David Con Hutton, principal of the Otago School of Art. She submitted work to the Intercolonial Juvenile Industrial Exhibition at Melbourne in 1880 and won a silver medal. Around 1881, Sperrey traveled to Rome to study portraiture with Giuseppe Ferrari. Her study of an Italian goatherd won a gold medal in the Prix de Rome competition, and was considered her masterpiece. Before she returned home to New Zealand, Sperrey also studied in London and Paris.

Career
Sperrey returned to New Zealand in 1884, moving to Wellington, where her father was living and working as the Commissioner of Taxation. She set up an office and became an official portrait artist, joining the New Zealand Art Students' Association in 1885. The organization, based in Auckland, encouraged members to paint solely subjects having to do with New Zealand. In 1886, she moved her studio to Lambton Quay. She participated in numerous exhibitions including the Otago Art Society's shows in both 1886 and 1887, the New South Wales Art Society 1886 Sydney Town Hall exhibit, the Auckland Society of Art's exhibitions of 1887 and 1888, the Centennial Exhibition of 1889 in Melbourne and the South Seas Exhibition of Dunedin in both 1889 and 1890. 

On 19 September 1888 in Wellington, Sperrey married Captain Gilbert Mair, whose portrait she had painted in 1886 when he had been awarded the New Zealand Cross. Mair was a soldier and civil servant, who had previously fathered two sons and a daughter with the Ngāti Tūwharetoa woman, Keita Kupa. The new couple had two children of their own, John Gilbert, on 5 July 1889, who died in infancy, and Kathleen Irene, known as Airini, (1891–1965), who would become a noted artist under her married name, as K. Airini Vane. After her marriage Sperrey, continued painting, signing her works as E. K. Mair.

In 1889, Mair created paintings which earned first, second and third prizes, in the oil and water colour category of the Melbourne Fine Art Exhibit. Predominantly known as a portrait artist, she painted the likenesses of such figures as Sir Harry Atkinson, John Ballance, Sir William Fitzherbert, Sir George Grey, and James Macandrew, among many others. She was also renowned for her paintings of Māori subjects, some of which included Wairingiringi, a Ngāti Mahuta woman and her husband, Te Wahanui, a Ngāti Maniapoto tribal leader. In 1890, for New Zealand's Golden Jubilee, Musings in Maoriland, by Thomas Bracken was published outlining the colony's development of art and literature. The 400-page commemorative volume was illustrated with sepia sketches by Sperrey which were engraved in Nuremberg, Germany. Two of her last works were portraits of her own children.

Death and legacy
Mair died on 23 April 1893 in Blenheim, New Zealand and was buried in Wellington in the Bolton Street Cemetery, beside her father. Her self-portrait is in the collection of the Alexander Turnbull Library and her most noted work, Italian goatherd is in the collection of the Museum of New Zealand Te Papa Tongarewa. She also has works in Auckland Art Gallery and Christchurch Art Gallery. In 2000, a retrospective of her works were presented by the Whangarei Art Museum between January and March followed by a presentation at the Sarjeant Gallery, which ran through the end of May. The Whangarei Art Museum hosted an exhibit featuring two of Mair's works, in 2012. One was her portrait of Prime Minister Sir George Grey and the other was a painting of a bush scene. The two paintings had been in storage for a century and are now part of the museum's permanent collection.

References

Citations

Bibliography

 

1862 births
1893 deaths
19th-century New Zealand women artists
People from Wellington City
New Zealand women painters
New Zealand painters
Portrait artists
People educated at Otago Girls' High School
People from Geelong
Australian emigrants to New Zealand